SS Delphic was an ocean liner of the White Star Line, built by Harland and Wolff in Belfast and completed on 15 May 1897. She worked the New Zealand trade. She was a fairly slow ship primarily intended for transporting emigrants and goods to New Zealand. Despite this, she made her first crossings on the New York route before joining the route to New Zealand. For twenty years, her service on this route was uneventful, with the exception of troop transport missions during the Second Boer War.

World War I did not disturb her service until March 1917, when she was requisitioned to serve in the war effort. It was during a crossing to South America, the following May, that the ship was torpedoed by the German submarine . Five people were killed, but the ship sank slowly enough that the rest of the crew could be evacuated, before the ship was sunk by additional torpedoes.

History
In 1884, White Star Line inaugurated its service to New Zealand, in order to diversify its activities. It did not go into the business alone as the service was joint with Shaw, Savill & Albion Line which had a good knowledge of the region while its partner brought significant financial resources. Thus, the service was launched with three ships of the White Star, the Coptic, the Ionic and the Doric, and two ships of the Shaw, Savill & Albion, the Arawa and the Tainui. This service quickly turned out to be very promising. Thus, in 1893, White Star brought a new ship to the fleet, the Gothic; it was the largest ship on this route, and its first-class facilities offered comfort on the same level as that of the ships on the prestigious transatlantic route.

In 1897, a slightly smaller version of the Gothic (although at a higher tonnage) was ordered to join the route: the Delphic. Slower, she was intended for the transport of a thousand migrants as well as goods. The ship, built by the Harland and Wolff shipyards, was launched on 5 January 1897. Upon her delivery in May 1897 to White Star Line it was decided to give Delphics machinery a run in with several voyages on the Atlantic, as such her maiden voyage began on 17 June between Liverpool and New York, she made two round trips across the Atlantic before entering service on her intended route between London and Wellington on 3 October 1897.

Her career on this new route was uneventful for nearly twenty years, with the exception of the very beginning of the 20th century. She was requisitioned on 31 March 1900 to transport 1,200 soldiers from London to Cape Town as part of the Second Boer War, after which she continued her service on the route to New Zealand. On 4 April 1901, she was again employed for this purpose, this time from Queenstown.

Following the outbreak of World War I in 1914, she remained on her commercial service. In March 1917, she was taken over under the Liner Requisition Scheme. On 16 August 1917, Delphic was torpedoed and sunk by the Imperial German Navy submarine   from Bishop Rock, Isles of Scilly, during a coal transport voyage from Cardiff, Wales, to Montevideo, Uruguay. Five people were killed in the sinking.

Charactertistics
At 144.8 m in length and 16.9 m in width, Delphic was built as a smaller and slower version of the earlier liner Gothic which also served the New Zealand service, but more space was given over to passenger accommodation rather than cargo, and this gave Delphic a capacity for 1,000 steerage passengers. She sported a classic silhouette for ships of the time, with four masts (unlike the Gothics, the Delphics forward mast could carry sails) surrounding a funnel in the colors of the White Star Line: brown ocher with black cuff.

Powered by triple expansion machines that powered a propeller, she sailed at a speed of 11 to 12 knots, slower than her fellow ships. This speed therefore made her suitable for transporting a less affluent clientele, made up of emigrants.

References

Bibliography

Ocean liners
1897 ships
Ships built by Harland and Wolff
Ships of the White Star Line
Ships built in Belfast
Maritime incidents in 1917
Ships sunk by German submarines in World War I
World War I shipwrecks in the Atlantic Ocean